Kariyushi58 (かりゆし58, stylized as "kariyushi58" in English) is a Japanese four-man pop group formed in 2005, from Okinawa Prefecture, Japan, and headliner of the Utanohi music festival. The group consists of Maekawa Shingo (vocal and bass), Shinya Yukihiro (guitar), Nakamura Hiroki (drums), Miyahira Naoki (guitar).

Their sound contains many elements of traditional Okinawan folk music, Rock, and Reggae. The name is a portmanteau of the Okinawan かりゆし, meaning "harmony" or "happiness", and 58, the number of the local Japanese National Route.

Members

History 
In April 2005, Shingo, Yukihiro, and Hiroki formed the group in the Okinawa Prefecture.

They made their official debut in February 2006 with the mini album, "Koibitoyo". Around the same year, they released a single called "Anma" in July 5 and August 13, which they would win the Japan Wired Grand Prix Rookie of the Year Award for it. On September 13, 2006, they released another mini album, "Ujinouta".

In April 2007, they released their "Toteto" EP. On October 23, 2007, the band released their first studio album, "Soro-Soro, Kariyushi"(そろそろ、かりゆし).

In 2008, Naoki joined the band as the guitarist.

Discography

Albums 
 Koibitiyo (2006)
 Ujinouta (2006)
 Deji,Kariyushi (2009)
 Kariyushi58BEST (2011)
 Go (2012)
 Hachi (2013)
 Daikinboshi (2014)
 Twushibyi,Kariyushi (2016)
 Kawariyoshi (2017)
 Bandwagon (2020)

See also
 Okinawan music
 Music of Japan

References

External links
 official site

Japanese rock music groups
Musical groups from Okinawa Prefecture
Musical groups established in 2005
Musical quartets